Slovenian Cricket Association is the official governing body of the sport of cricket in Slovenia. Slovenian Cricket Association is Slovenia's representative at the International Cricket Council and is an associate member and has been a member of that body since 2005. It is also a member of the European Cricket Council. Ljubljana Cricket Club, Slovenia's most established club, play in the Austrian Cricket Association's Open League in addition to the Slovenian National League.

Its Patron is Englishman Paul F. Quigley

References

External links
Official site of Slovenian Cricket Association
Official site of Slovenian Cricket Association (in Slovenian)

Cricket administration
Sports governing bodies in Slovenia